Howard McGhee and Milt Jackson is an album by American jazz trumpeter Howard McGhee with vibraphonist Milt Jackson featuring performances recorded in 1948 and released by the Savoy label in 1955 on a 12-inch LP.

Reception
The Allmusic review by Jim Todd stated: "this is an unpretentious slice of bebop heaven, particularly attractive to listeners interested in the trumpeter".

Track listing
All compositions by Howard McGhee except as indicated
 "Merry Lee" - 2:04 	
 "Short Life" - 1:57 	
 "Talk of the Town" (Jerry Livingston, Al J. Neiburg, Marty Symes) - 2:50 	
 "Bass C Jam" (Herman Lubinsky) - 2:56 	
 "Flip Lip" - 2:29 	
 "Belle from Bunnycock" - 2:44 	
 "Down Home" - 2:44 	
 "Sweet and Lovely" (Gus Arnheim, Jules LeMare, Harry Tobias) - 2:59 	
 "Fiesta" (M. Daniels) - 2:08 	
 "I'm in the Mood for Love" (Jimmy McHugh, Dorothy Fields) - 2:53 	
 "The Man I Love" (George Gershwin, Ira Gershwin) - 2:39 	
 "The Last Word" - 2:20
 corrected recording date info: tracks 5, 6, 11 & 12, October 15 or November 10, 1947; tracks 1-4 & 7-10, December 24-31, 1947 (all recorded in Chicago for the Vitacoustic Records label).

Personnel
 Howard McGhee - trumpet
 Milt Jackson - vibraphone (tracks 1-4 & 7-10)
 Billy Eckstine - valve trombone (tracks 5, 6 & 12)
 Jimmy Heath - alto saxophone, baritone saxophone (tracks 1-4, 7 & 10)
 Kenny Mann - tenor saxophone (tracks 5, 6 & 12)
 Will Davis (tracks 1-4 & 7-10), Hank Jones (tracks 5, 6, 11 & 12) - piano
 Percy Heath (tracks 1-4 & 7-10), Ray Brown (tracks 5, 6, 11 & 12) - bass
 Joe Harris (tracks 1-4 & 7-10), J.C. Heard (tracks 5, 6, 11 & 12) - drums
 Marcel Daniels (tracks 5 & 12) - vocal

References 

 

Savoy Records albums
Howard McGhee albums
Milt Jackson albums
1955 albums